Daran Morrison Nordland (born ), known professionally as Daran Norris, is an American actor. He has appeared or voiced characters in more than 400 films, video games, and television programs, including: Gordy in Ned's Declassified School Survival Guide; Cliff McCormack in Veronica Mars; the voices of Cosmo, Jorgen Von Strangle, Anti-Cosmo, and Mr. Turner in The Fairly OddParents; Buddha Bob in Big Time Rush; and Knock Out in Transformers Prime.

Career
Norris has been an actor since 1988, beginning such work in television commercials for Pop-Tarts, and moving into film, television, and voice work in the 1990s.

Live action
His first film was Hobgoblins in 1988. Afterwards, he moved to television.

Norris is known for the role as Gordy in 44 episodes of Ned's Declassified School Survival Guide.  Gordy is the "school's lazy, wacky janitor" who always goads Ned into rash actions while acting as Ned's go-to guy for advice. Norris recurred as Buddha Bob in the 2010 series Big Time Rush.

He portrayed Cliff McCormack, a public defender and family friend in the television drama Veronica Mars. The character of McCormack served as an ally to Keith and Veronica Mars and a client of Mars Investigations. He has known Mars creator Rob Thomas since he was three. He would reprise the role in the movie, released in 2014, and the fourth season, which debuted on Hulu in 2019. He would also recur on Thomas's subsequent series, iZombie as weatherman turned anchorman Johnny Frost, from 2015-2019.

In 2015, it was announced that Norris would star as Phil Hartman in a film about him, directed by Jason Priestley. As of 2022 the film has not been made.

Voice acting
Among his voice projects, Norris voiced characters in 22 episodes of Codename: Kids Next Door from 2002 through 2007, and 18 episodes of The Marvelous Misadventures of Flapjack from 2008 through 2009.  He is noted for voicing the lead Dick Daring in 71 episodes of The Replacements from 2006 through 2009, and for voicing Mr. Turner, Cosmo, and Jorgen Von Strangle, for The Fairly OddParents franchise from 2001 to present, including 126 episodes of the television series, six specials, and seven TV movies, as well as voicing these same characters in the related Jimmy Timmy Power Hour trilogy: The Jimmy Timmy Power Hour, The Jimmy Timmy Power Hour 2: When Nerds Collide, and The Jimmy Timmy Power Hour 3: The Jerkinators.  In October 2010, Norris voiced the Decepticon 'Knock Out' in The Hub TV network original series, Transformers: Prime. He has also been a voice over in the popular anime show Ghost in the Shell: Stand Alone Complex. Norris recurs as the voice of The Chief and The Chameleon in the 2010 series T.U.F.F. Puppy. He also played Mr. Turner in the special live-action television film A Fairly Odd Movie: Grow Up, Timmy Turner!. He has done commercials for Burger King. He also is the voice of Jack Smith (Stan Smith's estranged father) on American Dad!.

Personal life
Born in 1964 in Ferndale, Washington, Norris graduated from Ferndale High School in 1983, and married voice actress Mary Elizabeth McGlynn in 1988. They divorced in 2012.

Filmography

Live action roles

Film

Television

Voice roles

Animation

Anime

Film

Video games

References

External links
 
 

1964 births
20th-century American male actors
21st-century American male actors
American male film actors
American male television actors
American male video game actors
American male voice actors
Living people